Code Lyoko: Quest for Infinity is a 2007 video game for the Wii console based on the animated television series Code Lyoko. It is the second game based on the French animated television series Code Lyoko. PlayStation 2 and PlayStation Portable ports of the game were released in 2008.

It is the only Code Lyoko video game released on home consoles, as well as the only game for the Sony consoles.

Plot
The game loosely follows Season 4 of the original series. After finishing the Skidbladnir in Carthage, the Lyoko Warriors set off to explore the Digital Sea. They discover numerous Replikas, in which they first use Code: Chimera to destroy them. After discovering that the Replikas are connected to supercomputers on Earth, Jeremie creates a process where the gang can transform into specters on Earth and keep their powers. This is later on used to destroy the five supercomputers. At the end of the game, Aelita and Odd destroy the Volcano Replika's supercomputer and rescue William from XANA's clutches.

Gameplay

The characters are controlled through various motions with the Wii Remote: slashing controls Ulrich's sword, aiming Odd's arrows by pointing with the Wii Remote, Yumi's balance on narrow walkways is maintained by tilting the controller, and both the Wii Remote and the Nunchuk are used in conjunction to make Aelita fly. The game features locations not seen in the show, including the volcano sector. Unlike the previous game, the player is able to change characters whenever desired.

Reception

Code Lyoko: Quest for Infinity received "mixed" reviews on all platforms according to the review aggregation website Metacritic.

References

External links
 
 Europe Code Lyoko Wii Game Factory page
 American Code Lyoko Wii Game Factory page

2007 video games
Qyest for Infinity
PlayStation 2 games
PlayStation Portable games
Video games developed in France
Wii games
Neko Entertainment games
Video games based on animated television series
Video games about parallel universes
The Game Factory games
Single-player video games